Peniculimius api is a moth in the family Crambidae. It was described by Schouten in 1994. It is found in Sarawak, Malaysia.

References

Diptychophorini
Moths described in 1994